Euphorbia sakarahaensis is a species of plant in the family Euphorbiaceae. It is endemic to Madagascar.  Its natural habitat is subtropical or tropical dry forests. It is threatened by habitat loss. It was described by Werner Rauh in 1992.

References

Endemic flora of Madagascar
sakarahaensis
Vulnerable plants
Taxonomy articles created by Polbot